Razzakar is an Indian Marathi language film directed and writer by 
Raj Durge. The film starring Siddhartha Jadhav , Jyoti Subhash, Zakhir Hussian and Dop by Aniket Khandagle. The film was released on 27 February 2015.

Synopsis 
Razzakar is based on a true story about the Hyderabad Liberation Movement (Razakars (Hyderabad)) of 1948. The film shows the protagonist's journey from a commoner to that of a freedom fighter.

Cast 
 Shashank Shende
 Siddhartha Jadhav 
 Jyoti Subhash
 Zakhir Hussian

Soundtrack

Critical response 
Razzakar film received mixed reviews from critics. A reviewer from Divya Marathi gave the film a rating of 3/5 and wrote "The film is well done as the technical skills have a good grip on the screenplay. Every scene from the first frame to the last is very well constructed". A reviewer from The Times of India gave the film a rating of 2.5/5 and wrote "Keeping the narrative crisp and giving more focus on the history bit would have done wonders for this film. Unfortunately, what we get is a half-baked cake that refuses to finish". A reviewer of Zee News gave the film 1.5 stars out of 5 and wrote "In some places, the scenes are inserted at the wrong time... Although the movie starts well, slowly the movie starts to feel boring". Ganesh Matkari of Pune Mirror wrote "The actors in Razakar somehow manage this over a very long stretch of time. I only wish they had something to show for their patience and hard work". Jaydeep Pathak of Maharashtra Times gave the film 1.5 stars out of 5 and says "We should read and study this bloody history. Why should you waste your precious time by watching movies in such category only with such efforts?".

References

External links
 

2015 films
2010s Marathi-language films
Indian drama films